Hamilius: Hip Hop Culture in Luxembourg is a 2010 documentary film directed by Alain Tshinza and  produced by Luxembourgish production company Antevita Films.

This film premiered 18 March 2010 at the Utopolis in Luxembourg City. The film is entirely spoken in Luxembourgish and French, but English subtitles are shown.

Synopsis 
In the 2010 documentary "Hamilius: Hip Hop Culture in Luxembourg" a production of Antevita Films. Produced by Raoul Nadalet and directed by Alain Tshinza, the movie showcases the growth of the culture through the 1980s, 1990s and 2000s in the small country of Luxembourg. Centered around the Four elements of hip hop (Breakdance, Graffiti, Rap and DJing) the movie follows local practitioners from the different generations and gives an in-depth view of a culture that is often associated with violence and juvenile delinquency. 

Named after the tunnel under the Émile Hamilius square at 'Le Centre Hamilius' the same name that is symbolic of the provincial state, which became a meeting point for dancers and members of the local hip-hop scene. The film offers an interesting angle on Luxembourgish culture and language through several generations of an art scene and movement which has seen its active members grow to positions as scholars, professors, entrepreneurs and journalists, coming from a space that is often swept under the rug.

Cast

See also
 Cinema of Luxembourg

References

External links 
 (official website) of Hamilius: Hip Hop Culture in Luxembourg
 

2010 films
2010 documentary films
Luxembourgian hip hop
2010s French-language films
Luxembourgish-language films
Documentary films about graffiti
Luxembourgian documentary films
Documentary films about the visual arts
2010s hip hop films
Graffiti in Luxembourg
Films set in Luxembourg
2010 multilingual films
Luxembourgian multilingual films
French-language Luxembourgian films